In typography, a thin space is a space character whose width is usually  or  of an em. It is used to add a narrow space, such as between nested quotation marks or to separate glyphs that interfere with one another. It is not as narrow as the hair space. It is also used in the International System of Units and in many countries as a thousands separator when writing numbers in groups of three digits, in order to facilitate reading.

Unicode's  is a non-breaking space with a width similar to that of the thin space.

In LaTeX and Plain TeX, \thinspace produces a narrow, non-breaking space. Inside and outside of math formulae in LaTeX, \, also produces a narrow, non-breaking space.

In some versions of Microsoft Word, the symbol dialog (often available via Insert > Symbol or Insert > Special Characters), has both the thin space and the narrow no-break space available for point-and-click insertion. In Word's Symbol dialog, under font = "(normal text)", they are found in subset = "General Punctuation", Unicode character 2009 and nearby. Other word processing programs have ways of producing a thin space.

See also

 Figure space
 Whitespace character for additional space characters of various widths

References

Typography
Whitespace